Neophoca is a genus of the family Otariidae (sea lions and fur seals) of order Carnivora. It is combined by some taxonomists with the genus Phocarctos, the (extant) New Zealand sea lion. Only one species survives:

N. cinerea: Australian sea lion. Most subpopulations are small and genetically isolated.

Extinct species:
N. palatina, known from a skull found in New Zealand

References

 
Mammal genera
Mammal genera with one living species
Taxa named by John Edward Gray